Rowlands is a surname, and may refer to:

 Clive Rowlands 
 David Rowlands (disambiguation)
 Gena Rowlands
 Graham Rowlands
 Hugh Rowlands
 Jim Rowlands
 John Rowlands (disambiguation), several persons
 June Rowlands
 Keith Rowlands
 Mark Rowlands
 Martin Rowlands
 Patsy Rowlands
 Richard Rowlands
 Samuel Rowlands
 Ted Rowlands, Baron Rowlands
 William Bowen Rowlands
 William Penfro Rowlands, composer of the hymn tune Blaenwern

See also
 Rowland (disambiguation)

English-language surnames
Patronymic surnames
Surnames from given names